The National Technical Reports Library (NTRL) was created by the National Technical Information Service (NTIS), an agency of the U.S. Department of Commerce, as a means of disseminating federally-funded scientific, technical, engineering, and business information.

Previously a subscription-based service, the NTRL re-launched as a public, open-access website on October 1, 2016, allowing free access to three million records and abstracts in its bibliographic database and over 800,000 digitized full-text reports.

References

External links
National Technical Information Service 
National Technical Reports Library 
United States Department of Commerce 

Online archives of the United States